Tom Conway (born 7 March 1959 in Dublin) was an Irish soccer player during the 1980s and 1990s. He comes from a famous footballing family with brothers Jimmy and John also being noted players.

Career
He made his League of Ireland debut for Athlone Town A.F.C. on 23 October 1977.

His other clubs in the League of Ireland included Bohemians (who he made 2 European appearances for), Sligo Rovers and Longford Town. Tom won 2 League winners medals with Athlone before joining Bohs in 1985.

Had a joint testimonial with Padraig O'Connor in May 1985.

Honours
 League of Ireland: 2
 Athlone Town – 1980–81, 1982–83
 Leinster Senior Cup (football)
 Bohemian F.C. – 1985

References

Republic of Ireland association footballers
Association football defenders
League of Ireland players
League of Ireland XI players
Bohemian F.C. players
Athlone Town A.F.C. players
Longford Town F.C. players
Sligo Rovers F.C. players
Living people
1959 births